The 1993 Brabantse Pijl was the 33rd edition of the Brabantse Pijl cycle race and was held on 28 March 1993. The race started and finished in Alsemberg. The race was won by Edwig Van Hooydonck.

General classification

References

1993
Brabantse Pijl